Armand Tallier (6 August 1887 – 1 March 1958) was a French stage and film actor of the silent era. In 1925 he established a small cinema in Paris, the Studio des Ursulines, to secure screenings of avant garde films that would struggle to get a mainstream release.

Selected filmography
 Blanchette (1912)
 The Torture of Silence (1917)
 Marion Delorme (1918)
 Simone (1918)
 Mathias Sandorf (1921)

References

Bibliography
 Goble, Alan. The Complete Index to Literary Sources in Film. Walter de Gruyter, 1999.
 Hagener, Malte. Moving Forward, Looking Back: The European Avant-garde and the Invention of Film Culture, 1919-1939. Amsterdam University Press, 2007.

External links

1887 births
1958 deaths
French male film actors
French male silent film actors
20th-century French male actors
French male stage actors
French theatre directors
Male actors from Marseille